Grange is a village near Clonmel in County Tipperary, Ireland.

History 
In 1829, a catholic church was established in the village.  In 1857, a school was established adjacent to the church.  Separate boys' and girls' schools used the same building, and were headed by Thomas Hackett and his wife, Bridget, respectively. In 1932, school principal James Mulcahy combined the boys' and girls' schools. In January 1967, the school was amalgamated with the national school in North Grange, with 19 students moving to Grange School.

Sport 
The village is served by Ballybacon-Grange GAA, an intermediate hurling team in the Gaelic Athletic Association.

See also
 List of towns and villages in Ireland

References 

Towns and villages in County Tipperary